The Chevrolet Optra is an automotive nameplate used by the Chevrolet marque for two different compact car models, in the following markets:

Daewoo Lacetti (2004–2013), in markets such as Colombia, Canada, Mexico, Japan and Southeast Asia
Baojun 630 (2011–present), in Egypt

Optra